The Imperial War Graves Commission Staff Association was a trade union in the United Kingdom. It merged with the Transport and General Workers' Union in 1938 and renamed Unite the Union when the transport and general workers union merged with another trade union.

See also
 List of trade unions
 Transport and General Workers' Union
 TGWU amalgamations

References
 Arthur Ivor Marsh & Victoria Ryan. Historical Directory of Trade Unions, Volume 5 Ashgate Publishing, Ltd., Jan 1, 2006 p. 435

Defunct trade unions of the United Kingdom
Public sector trade unions
Transport and General Workers' Union amalgamations
Commonwealth War Graves Commission
Trade unions disestablished in 1938